Biryawaza was a powerful ruler in the area of Egyptian controlled Syria in the middle fourteenth century BC. He is often mentioned in the Amarna letters, although his title is never given clearly. Some scholars describe him as the king of Damascus, and others think he was a high Egyptian official.

In the Amarna letters, Biryawaza was ordered by his Egyptian overlords to take armed action against Labaya's sons (EA 250). In another Amarna letter, King Burna-Buriash II of Babylonia said Biryazawa attacked a Babylonian caravan sending gifts to Pharaoh Akhenaten.

The name Biryawaza is Indo-European in origin. Biryawaza may have been of an Indo-European maryannu caste similar to that which ruled the Mitanni and later, the Hittites.

Biryawaza wrote four Amarna letters (EA 194–197).

Notes

Ancient Syria
Ancient Damascus
Amarna letters officials
People from Damascus